Racial politics or race politics is the use of race, as a human categorization or hierarchical identifier, in political discourse, campaigns, or within the societal and cultural climate created by such practice. The phenomenon can involve the activity of political actors exploiting the issue of race to forward an agenda.

North America

In Canada 
Rosemary Brown has been described as one of the earliest politicians to attempt to challenge the divisive racial politics of Canada during the 1975 New Democratic Party leadership election.

In 2015, Jagmeet Singh campaigned against police carding, in what Maclean's described was "racial politics were at the crux" of the policy. Ahead of the 2019 Canadian federal election, while describing them as "conditional multiculturalists", a National Observer analysis stated that white Canadians didn't easily engage in racial politics.

In United States 
One of the uses of the term Racial politics in the United States is to describe racially charged political actions by Abigail Thernstrom, the vice-chairman of the U.S. commission on civil rights.  The practice has been a major part of American government since its creation, and often divides the Republican and Democratic parties.

The United States Government has since the time of its creation been divided, and in many ways developed based upon issues of race.  In 1861 the Civil War between the Northern and Southern states of the nation was fought primarily over the Confederacy's practice of enslaving African Americans based solely on their race.

Furthermore, the tension between the Northern Republicans and Southern Democrats continued for many years after as the South created Jim Crow laws and continued the segregation of individuals of color. The racial divide in the nation continued.

In 1896, the Supreme Court of the United States determined that the, "separate but equal", doctrine was constitutional in the case Plessy v. Ferguson.  Segregation was legal, so long as the segregated schools and facilities provided to whites and blacks were equal.  Plaintiff Homer Plessy, tested the law that required separate accommodations for blacks and whites on railroads.

In 1954, the ruling of Plessy v. Ferguson was overturned in the Supreme Court case Brown v. Board of Education.  The Supreme Court determined that the establishment of separate schools for whites and blacks was inherently unequal and unconstitutional.  This was a major success for civil rights advocates, including the NAACP.

In 1967, California Governor Ronald Reagan signed the Mulford Act as reaction to growing racial politics in the country. Supported by the National Rifle Association, the motivation of the Act has been described as racially motivated, in relation to the growing Black Panther movement.

In 1997, the interim replacement of Yvonne Gonzalez with a white man as Dallas ISD superintendent, was met with public unrest due to the racial politics of the situation.

Another concept within the discussion of racial politics is the re-drawing and shaping of district lines. The left of the political spectrum argues that this is done to seclude minorities in certain areas. As written by J.L. Fisher for Michigan Law review;

Under the Bandemer plurality's test, a redistricting plan constitutes an unconstitutional partisan gerrymander only if it "will consistently degrade a voter's or a group of voters' influence on the political process as a whole."  In doing this, Republicans and Democrats alike ensure certain trends in voting patterns and constituent concerns, as they place a high concentration of minorities within a voting district.  This is a crucial aspect of modern-day politics and is often a major factor in elections.

By 2019, racial politics was being increasingly identified as a reemergent phenomenon, with some media describing it at its most extreme in the history of the United States. In October 2019, on the death of Elijah Cummings, a CNN analysis discussed the congressman's understanding of racial politics in the US, praising his ability to "navigate a white world - how to get along with white Americans as a means of better holding the country to account".

Oceania

In Australia 

In 2014, Vox reported how "Australia's twisted racial politics created horrific detention camps for immigrants", such as Nauru Regional Processing Centre, describing the country's treatment of immigrants as a return to the racial insecurities of white Australians and the white supremacy of the 20th-century White Australia policy.

Rita Panahi publicly dismissed Australian basketball player Ben Simmons' claim that he was refused entry to Crown Melbourne due to his race in August 2019. Panahi wrote that "He seems to be afflicted by this racial politics that everyone in the US has gone nuts with where they see everything with a filter of race". In October 2019, author Peter FitzSimons stated that his latest book on James Cook, was an attempt to improve the racial politics of the country, which he compared unfavorably with New Zealand's race relations.

Asia

In Malaysia 

Malaysian politician Chang Ko Youn said "Malaysia has practised racial politics for 51 years and we know it is divisive as each party only talks on behalf of the racial group it represents... When all races are in a single party, no one person will try to be the champion of the party.... It is easy to be a Malay hero, a Malaysian Chinese hero or a Malaysian Indian hero but it is difficult to be a Malaysian hero.... The country is facing economic problems now and it is important that the Government and political parties come up with a Malaysian agenda on how to unite the people and face these challenges..."

On August 13, 2008, a letter was sent to The Star with the title "Why we can't get our experts to return" saying:

Writer A. Asohan wrote: "...you started to grow up, and race increasingly became a factor. You became aware of race politics here. Insidious people would hint that being friends with the "Other" made you a traitor to your own race. The racist rot seems to have intensified over the subsequent generations. The bigotry we learned as adults are now being picked up by our primary schoolkids. Our leaders may, in a fit of progressiveness (by their standards), talk about racial tolerance, but acceptance and appreciation for other races and cultures seem beyond their ken. Racial intolerance in the country is getting worse, we tell ourselves, looking back to a more idyllic past. Bah, what crock! We Malaysians have always been racists. Heck, the entire human race has always found some illusive basis for discrimination. Race, religion, colour, creed, whether you were born north or south of that artificial line called a border – we spend an inordinate amount of our time and resources on delineating our differences rather than celebrating our similarities. If you married someone from a different race in the old days, you faced severe social censure and were treated as an outcast. Parents wrung their hands and tore at their hair, wailing "What did we do wrong? Aiyoh, how can you do this to us?"

Marina Mahathir wrote: "...The same thing happened in our country. Unfortunately, race politics has not really died down yet, and some people reacted as if ethnic cleansing had just taken place...."

Politician Datuk Ngeh Koo Ham when he was asked "What do you dislike most about Malaysians?", he replied: Racial politics.

Chris Anthony wrote: "...After 50 years of living and working together side-by-side, the people have voted to do away with racial politics but unfortunately the politicians are far from showing signs of heeding their calls for multiracialism...." Don’t widen the racial divide - Opinion | The Star Online

Philip Bowring of International Herald Tribune wrote that the political organization of Malaysia has long been largely on racial lines, Islam has at times become a device for use in racial politics, a yardstick for measuring the commitment of competing parties to Malay racial advancement.

In 2019, the Malay Mail reported how the 2019 Tanjung Piai by-election would be an opportunity to move away from racial politics, by respecting the racial pluralism of Mohamed Farid Md Rafik, after his unexpected death.

The rich
In the year 2006, Datuk Seri Anwar Ibrahim on his release from 6 years of prison said in a number of interviews that the NEP should be abolished and that all races should be given equal opportunities and also that the NEP was bad because only the cronies of UMNO party became rich from it. Khairy Jamaluddin from UMNO party hit back at Anwar Ibrahim. Khairy said: "What cheek he has to speak" and also said that Anwar Ibrahim was the greatest UMNO party member of all and a very rich one too. Khairy, who is also the son-in-law of the nation's 5th prime minister is not without controversy. In 2016, Khairy was slammed over his responsibility as he embroiled in the controversy surrounding the RM100 million corruption scandal plaguing the Youth and Sports Ministry he led when a senior official who had allegedly to have covertly siphoned off the ministry’s funds and lived a lavish lifestyle over the past six years was arrested by Malaysian Anti-Corruption Commission (MACC) - Khairy Jamaluddin Controversies and issues

In popular culture
 The route to the Oscars for 2018 film Green Book was described by TIME magazine as "riddled with missteps and controversies over its authenticity and racial politics."
Author Judy Nunn's Khaki Town, reviewed by Kerryn Goldsworthy in The Sydney Morning Herald, was described in 2019 as a "complex tale of racial politics and racist behaviour, as practised on both sides of the Pacific".
The Guardian reviewed 2019's Zombie horror-genre film Atlantics, reporting how it had engaged with racial politics.
 In 2020, the Super Bowl LIV halftime show, which featured a co-headlined performance from Jennifer Lopez and Shakira was reported by MoJo magazine to be a feature of the "messy racial politics" in the US, due to the homogenized, non-black representation of Latino culture.

Further reading

See also
 Apartheid
 Conviction politics
 Diaspora politics
 Identity politics
 Human rights
 Separatism

References 

 Thernstrom, Abigail. THE NATION Racial Politics, As Ever Democrats will be demagogic; when will Republicans counter them? March 19, 2007.  National Review. 2007

American culture
Racism
Identity politics